Luukkanen is a Finnish surname. Notable people with the surname include:

 Eino Luukkanen (1909–1964), Finnish World War II fighter ace
 Arto Luukkanen (born 1964), Finnish historian and social scientist
 Johannes Luukkanen (born 1999), Finnish professional footballer

Finnish-language surnames